The Emil Bach House is a Prairie style house in the Rogers Park neighborhood of Chicago, Illinois, United States that was designed by architect Frank Lloyd Wright. The house was built in 1915 for an admirer of Wright's work, Emil Bach, the co-owner of the Bach Brick Company. The house is representative of Wright's late Prairie style and is an expression of his creativity from a period just before his work shifted stylistic focus. The Bach House was declared a Chicago Landmark on September 28, 1977, and was added to the U.S. National Register of Historic Places on January 23, 1979.

History
On December 5, 1914, Emil Bach and his wife Anna purchased the site of the Bach House from Amelia Ludwick and her husband. In 1915 Bach commissioned Frank Lloyd Wright to design the house. Joseph Peacock purchased the house from the Bachs in 1934 and owned it until 1947. The property changed hands twice in 1951; the final sale was in December to Manuel Weiss who held the property until 1959. That year he sold the house to Joseph Blinder.

In 2003, Toulabi put the home up for sale with a price of US$2.5 million, it was later listed at $1.9 million. The house lingered on the market for months before it was finally put up for auction with a starting bid of $750,000, less than a third of the original asking price. Factors contributing to the slow market for the Wright designed landmark included the restrictive nature of local landmark ordinances which prevent owners from making significant alterations without prior approval. The Rogers Park neighborhood changed from a once quiet lake front, country area to a busy street, which also contributed to the sluggish demand for the house. Preservationists expressed concern surrounding the auction and the question of the final destiny for the expansive 45 ft (13.72 m) by 150 ft (45.72 m) side yard. The yard is zoned "RT-4" which, among other residential uses, allowed bidders the option to develop high rise apartments or condominiums.  When the home finally sold at auction, "well above the opening bid of $750,000," the new owners revealed that they intended to live in the house and preserve the yard.
In 2009, according to Crain's Chicago, Jennifer Pritzker paid $1.7 million to acquire the house.  "The seller, Jane Elizabeth Feerer, bought the famous architect's Prairie-style home at a 2005 auction for $1.17 million. She financed the acquisition with a loan for just under that amount from a trust controlled by Ms. Pritzker, president and CEO of investment firm Tawani Enterprises Inc., according to property records."

Following an extensive restoration, the house was re-opened to the public in 2014. It is available for rent.

Architecture
The Bach House is one of the homes that Wright designed after his late 1910 return from Europe which is still extant in the city of Chicago. The home is part of a series of geometric, cubic homes with overhanging, flat roofs designed by Wright in the early 20th century. These details were first published by Wright in a 1907 Ladies Home Journal article. The first was the Laura Gale House in Oak Park, Illinois, followed by the Oscar Balch House, also in Oak Park, Coonley Kindergarten, the Frederick C. Bogk House and then the Bach House. Of the houses of this type in Chicago, with cubic masses and a slab roof, the Bach House is the only one left standing.

The 2,700 ft2 (250.84 m2) house was designed as a two-story single family residence with a basement. When the house was constructed it was a "country home" with a clear view of Lake Michigan from its rear (east) facade. Due to the changing nature of the Rogers Park neighborhood, the house now stands among commercial properties and apartment buildings on a busy city street (North Sheridan Road). Because of the lake view, the original building had a large rear porch and sun deck; they were both enclosed when houses were built between the Bach House and the lake, obstructing the view. The enclosure of the sun deck and porch utilized mainly glass, to aid in the alteration's melding with Wright's intended vision.  Nonetheless, the current owner intends to restore the rear porch and sun deck. Other alterations included the removal of some of Wright's signature built-in features. A built-in seat was removed from the living room and a built-in counter removed in the dining room.  Both have since been restored. On the second floor, the servant's room was converted into a second bathroom.

Significance
The Bach House is an example of Frank Lloyd Wright's late Prairie style and was designed in the period just prior to his transition to a more expressionist, Japanese influenced aesthetic. The home's individuality, coupled with its high artistic merit, and famous architect, make it significant historically and culturally. The city of Chicago declared the structure a Chicago Landmark on September 28, 1977, and on January 23, 1979, it was added to the U.S. National Register of Historic Places.

The Bach House is on prime Chicago real estate, one block from Lake Michigan. The neighborhood has been an area where developers bought property with the intent of building high-rise apartment and condominium buildings. According to experts such as Ronald Scherubel, the executive director of the Frank Lloyd Wright Building Conservancy in Chicago, a historic preservation easement  has likely been the only thing that has prevented demolition of the Bach House. The easement prohibits the destruction or alteration of the house without approval from the city and the Landmarks Preservation Council of Illinois.

Notes

Further reading
O'Gorman, Thomas J. Frank Lloyd Wright's Chicago, Thunder Bay Press, San Diego: 2004, pp. 298–99,.
 Storrer, William Allin. The Frank Lloyd Wright Companion. University Of Chicago Press, 2006,  (S.193)

External links
 

Frank Lloyd Wright buildings
Houses completed in 1915
Houses on the National Register of Historic Places in Chicago
Chicago Landmarks
Prairie School architecture in Illinois